is a museum of natural history in Higashisumiyoshi-ku, Ōsaka, Japan.

History
A preparatory committee for the establishment of the museum was set up in 1949, and late the following year the first display opened on the second floor of Osaka City Museum of Fine Arts. Designated a museum-equivalent facility in accordance with the Museum Act in 1952, the  opened in a repurposed elementary school in 1958. This predecessor institution closed to the public in 1973. The renamed Osaka Museum of Natural History opened in Nagai Park in 1974.

Collections

Publications

See also
 Museums in Osaka
 Wildlife of Japan

References

External links

 Osaka Museum of Natural History
 Electronic edition of the Museum Guidebook
 Archive of the Bulletin and other papers
 Bulletin of the Osaka Museum of Natural History

Museums in Osaka
Natural history museums in Japan
Higashisumiyoshi-ku, Osaka
1950 establishments in Japan
Museums established in 1950